Loriga is a Latin origin surname. Notable people with the surname include:

 Joaquín Loriga (1895–1927), Spanish aviator
 Ray Loriga (born 1967), Spanish author and film director
 Tobia Giuseppe Loriga (born 1977), Italian boxer